Cheremukhov is a rural locality (a khutor) in Mikhaylovka Urban Okrug, Volgograd Oblast, Russia. The population was 175 as of 2010. There are 2 streets.

Geography 
Cheremukhov is located 45 km southeast of Mikhaylovka. 2-y Sukhov is the nearest rural locality.

References 

Rural localities in Mikhaylovka urban okrug